Pandian is a 1992 Indian Tamil-language action film produced and directed by S. P. Muthuraman and written by Panchu Arunachalam. The film stars Rajinikanth, Khushbu, Janagaraj and Prabhakar. It is a remake of the 1991 Kannada film Bombay Dada which starred Prabhakar, who portrayed the antagonist of this film. The film was released on 25 October 1992 during Diwali and achieved modest success due to competition from other Diwali releases.

Plot 

The film centers around Pandian, who wants to avenge his brother-in-law's death. He joins the murderer's gang and seeks vengeance. Then the gang discovers that Pandian is performing an undercover operation, since Pandian is a police officer. Despite this, Pandian eventually captures the culprit.

Cast 
 Rajinikanth as Pandian I.P.S.
 Khushbu as Rekha
 Janagaraj as Vinayaga
 Prabhakar as Parameshwaran
 Vinu Chakravarthy as Rajendran
 Charan Raj as Ashok Kumar I.P.S.
 Radha Ravi as Lawyer of Parameswaran
 Delhi Ganesh as Public Prosecutor
 Rocky as Philips
 Prathapachandran as Police Officer
 Natraj as Press reporter
 V. Narasimhan as Commissioner of police
 Typist Gopu as Kannaiyan
 Archana Puran Singh as Reeta
 Jayasudha as Inspector Vijayalakshmi

Production 
Rajinikanth decided to make a low-budget film with director S. P. Muthuraman. Muthuraman produced the film under his production banner Visaalam Productions, named after his mother. Although not being a producer, Rajinikanth took care of production duties of the film along with M. Saravanan. Rajinikanth decided to act in the film to contribute to the retirement fund of main crew members of the Muthuraman team who were regulars in most of the latter's films. The film title was initially titled Nanban before being retitled to Pandian. It was Muthuraman's penultimate film as director, and remade from the 1991 Kannada film Bombay Dada. Prabhakar, who acted as that film's protagonist, portrayed a different role in Pandian, the antagonist. Rajinikanth acted in the film without taking any remuneration. This would be the last film in Rajinikanth portrayed a police officer until the release of Darbar (2020).

Soundtrack 
The soundtrack was composed by Ilaiyaraaja, while his son Karthik Raja composed "Pandianin Rajyathil", his first song.

Release and reception 
Pandiyan was released on 25 October 1992, Diwali day. Though Muthuraman's wife died 10 days before, he refused the crew's suggestion to postpone the release. The film opened up against other Diwali releases such as Thevar Magan, Senthamizh Paattu, Thirumathi Palanisamy and Rasukutty. The Indian Express called it "a typical Rajini film; a mishmash of all ingredients formulated to please his fans". New Straits Times wrote "This 135-minute movie is only for hard-core Rajini fans". C. R. K. of Kalki praised Muthuraman for taking a simple knot and making it interesting for seventeen reels which clearly shows his experience. Due to facing competition from Thevar Magan, Pandiyan achieved only moderate success. Even though it made some money, the money grossed was used for the retirement fund of Muthuraman's crew.

References

External links 
 

1990s Tamil-language films
1992 action films
1992 films
Fictional portrayals of the Tamil Nadu Police
Films directed by S. P. Muthuraman
Films scored by Ilaiyaraaja
Films with screenplays by Panchu Arunachalam
Indian action films
Indian courtroom films
Tamil remakes of Kannada films